Fort Stikine was a British Fort ship which was built in Canada in 1942. Owned by the American War Shipping Administration, she was leased under charter to the Ministry of War Transport under the Lend-Lease scheme and operated under the management of the Port Line. Fort Stikine only had a short career, and was destroyed in an explosion at Bombay, India, in April 1944 that caused the loss of a further thirteen ships.

Construction
The ship was propelled by a 505 NHP triple expansion steam engine which was built by the Dominion Engineering Works, Montreal, Quebec, Canada. It had cylinders of 24.5 inches (62 cm),  and  bore by  stroke. Fort and Park ship were the Canadian equivalent of the American Liberty ships. All three shared a similar design by J.L. Thompson and Sons of Sunderland, England. Fort ships had a single screw propeller.

History
Fort Stikine was built by Prince Rupert Drydock & Shipyard, Prince Rupert, British Columbia, Canada as yard number 43. She was built under the auspices of Wartime Merchant Shipping Ltd., a Canadian government corporation coordinating wartime shipbuilding in Canada, and on completion on 31 July 1942 delivered by that corporation to the United States War Shipping Administration (WSA) which then delivered the ship to the Ministry of War Transport under Lend Lease at Vancouver, British Columbia on the same date. Ownership was retained by WSA with the Ministry of War Transport placing her under the management of the Port Line. The United Kingdom Official Number 168351 and Code Letters BKLG were allocated. Her port of registry was London.

Fort Stikine departed from New Westminster, British Columbia, Canada on 7 September 1942 and arrived at Vancouver the next day. She then sailed to Comox, British Columbia, arriving on 10 September. She sailed two days later for Victoria, British Columbia arriving on 13 September. Fort Stikine sailed that day for Los Angeles, California, United States, where she arrived on 23 September. She sailed five days later for Balboa, Panama, arriving on 10 October. After transiting the Panama Canal, Fort Stikine departed from Cristobal, Panama on 17 October with Convoy ZG8. The convoy consisted eighteen merchant vessels escorted by six United States Navy warships. It arrived at Guantanamo Bay, Cuba on 21 October.

Fort Stikine departed from Guantanamo Bay on 23 October as a member of Convoy GN 14. The unescorted convoy consisted of 33 merchant ships; it arrived at New York on 30 October. She departed on 3 November with Convoy HX 214. The convoy consisted of 33 merchant ships, escorted by a total of seventeen warships over the duration of the convoy. Fort Stikine carried general cargo and mails. The convoy arrived at Liverpool, Lancashire, United Kingdom on 14 December. She then sailed to the Clyde, arriving on 16 December.

Fort Stikine departed from the Clyde on 24 December with Convoy KMS 6G. The convoy comprised 60 merchant ships escorted by a total of 22 warships over the duration of the convoy. The CAM ship  also provided some protection to the convoy. Two merchant ships were lost to enemy action and another was damaged. The convoy arrived at Bône, Algeria on 8 January 1943, but Fort Stikine had split from the convoy the previous day and arrived at Oran, Algeria. She sailed on 21 January to join Convoy MKS 6, which had departed from Philippeville, Algeria on 19 January and arrived back at Liverpool on 1 February. The convoy consisted of 50 merchant ships escorted by a total of 30 warships over the duration of the convoy, which also included Empire Darwin. One merchant vessel was lost to enemy action. The convoy arrived at Liverpool on 1 February. Fort Stikine had left the convoy off Ireland and arrived at the Clyde on 31 January.

Fort Stikine was a member of Convoy KMS 10G, which departed from the Clyde on 26 February. It consisted of 62 merchant ships, escorted by a total of nineteen warships over the duration of the convoy. One merchant ship was sunk and three were damaged by enemy action. The convoy arrived at Bône on 11 March. As with Convoy KMS 6G, Fort Stikine left the convoy and arrived at Oran a day earlier. She sailed on 31 March to join Convoy ET 16, which had departed from Bône earlier that day. The unescorted convoy included fifteen merchant vessels, two of which were sunk by enemy action. ET 16 arrived at Gibraltar on 1 April. Fort Stikine then joined Convoy RS 4, which departed on 14 April. The unescorted convoy, comprising nineteen merchant ships, arrived at Freetown, Sierra Leone on 25 April. Laden with a cargo of iron ore, Fort Stikine departed with Convoy SL 129 on 11 May. The convoy, comprising 47 merchant ships and nine warships, combined at sea with Convoy MKS 13 on 24 May. The combined convoy arrived at Liverpool on 1 June. Fort Stikine left the convoy before arrival at Liverpool and entered Loch Ewe. She then sailed to Middlesbrough, Yorkshire, via convoys WN 436 and FS 1133.

Fort Stikine departed from Middlesbrough on 20 June to join Convoy FN 1051, which had departed from Southend, Essex the previous day and arrived at Methil on 21 June. She then joined Convoy EN 246 which sailed the next day and arrived at Loch Ewe on 24 June. Fort Stikine joined Convoy ON 190, which had departed from Liverpool on 24 June. The convoy consisted of 85 merchant ships escorted by 23 warships over the duration of the convoy, which arrived at New York on 9 July. Fort Stikine sailed on to Baltimore, Maryland, arriving the next day. She departed from Baltimore on 3 August for the Hampton Roads, off the coast of Virginia. Fort Stikine sailed on 7 August with Convoy UGS 14. The convoy consisted of 106 merchant ships escorted by 31 warships over the duration of the convoy. Two merchant ships were lost to enemy action. The convoy arrived at Alexandria, Egypt on 2 September. Fort Stikine departed from Alexandria on 22 September and sailed via Port Said and Suez to Aden, where she arrived on 30 September.

On 10 October, Fort Stikine departed from Aden with Convoy AKD 3. The unescorted convoy, consisting eighteen merchant vessels, arrived at Durban, South Africa on 29 October. She left the convoy at Beira, Mozambique, arriving on 26 October. Fort Stikine sailed on 11 November and joined Convoy DKA 6. The unescorted convoy, consisting 20 merchant ships in total, had departed from Durban five days earlier and arrived at Aden on 28 November, but Fort Stikine had put into Dar es Salaam, Tanganyika, where she arrived on 17 November. She sailed on 20 November for Mombasa, Kenya, arriving the next day. She sailed a week later for Aden, from where she departed on 9 December for Suez and Port Said, arriving at the latter port on 19 December. Fort Stikine was a member of Convoy GUS 25, which departed from Port Said on 16 December. The convoy, consisting 106 merchant ships escorted by sixteen warships over its duration, arrived at the Hampton Roads on 17 January 1944. One merchant vessel was lost to enemy action. Fort Stikine left the convoy at Gibraltar, where she arrived on 28 December 1943.

Laden with copper, sisal and general cargo, Fort Stikine departed from Gibraltar on 11 January 1944 as a member of Convoy MKS 36G. The convoy, of twenty merchant ships and five escorting warships, made a rendezvous at sea with Convoy SL 145 the next day. The combined convoy arrived at Liverpool on 24 January.

Fort Stikine loaded at Birkenhead, Cheshire. Her cargo was described as general cargo; it consisted  of flares and signal rockets, incendiary bombs, mines, shells and torpedoes. These were bound for Bombay, India. A container with 31 crates each containing four gold bars was loaded in № 2 hold. She was also carrying twelve Supermarine Spitfire aircraft, some gliders and a further quantity of explosives that were destined to be offloaded at Karachi, India.

Fort Stikine joined Convoy OS 69KM, which departed from Liverpool on 23 February 1944. The convoy, consisting of 49 merchant ships escorted by twelve warships, split at sea on 5 March. The two convoys thus formed were OS 69, which arrived at Freetown on 15 March; and Convoy KMS 43G, which arrived at Gibraltar on 6 March. During the voyage to Gibraltar, a stowaway was discovered. He was put to work under the charge of the ship's Chief Engineer.

Fort Stikine continued her voyage as part of Convoy KMS 43, which departed from Gibraltar that day. The convoy, consisting 81 merchant ships and 4 escorting warships, arrived at Port Said on 16 March, having evaded an attack by four Focke-Wulf Fw 200 Condor aircraft. She sailed on to Suez, from where she departed the next day for Aden. The stowaway was offloaded at Port Tawfiq, Suez. Having reached Aden on 23 March, she sailed the same day for Karachi, arriving on 30 March.

To replace the cargo offloaded at Karachi, 8,700 bales of raw cotton were loaded, along with various quantities of fish manure, resin, rice, scrap iron, sulphur, and timber. Added to this were 1,000 barrels of lubricating oil. The ship's captain was concerned about having to take the flammable items but was told that they had to go. A proposal to add 750 drums of turpentine was refused. The ship's officers also expressed concerns over mixing the cargoes of cotton and the oil and explosives, but were unable to find paperwork that advised against this practice. In 1942, the United States Government had published a book which advised against the carriage of raw cotton. A common myth at the time was that wet cotton bales could spontaneously combust. This was not the case, although cotton soaked in oil would readily do so. Before the ship sailed, the crew discovered that the barrels of lubricating oil leaked. Tarpaulins were nailed over the lower hold covers and the firefighting equipment on board was thoroughly tested. Extra fire drills were scheduled during the voyage to Karachi. Fort Stikine sailed on 9 April to join Convoy PB 74, which had departed from Bandar Abbas, Iran on 6 April. The unescorted convoy arrived at Bombay on 12 April.

Loss

Fort Stikine arrived at Bombay in the early morning of 12 April. Having taken on a pilot shortly before 10:00 she was docked at the Victoria Dock at midday. The practice of flying a red flag to signify dangerous cargo on board had been discontinued in wartime as doing so would identify such vessels in the event of an enemy air raid on a port. Also, the practice on unloading such vessels into lighters offshore had also been discontinued due to the war. At the time, explosives were graded as Category A, B, or C. Category A explosives, such as those carried on board Fort Stikine, were the most dangerous. These were only allowed to be offloaded onto lighters, and not directly to the quayside.

Unloading of Fort Stikine began with the lubricating oil, followed by the fish manure. An extra gang of stevedores were employed on this task, which continued through the night of 13–14 April. At midday on 13 April, lighters arrived for the explosives. Minor engine repairs also started at that time, rendering the ship unable to move under her own power. At 12:30, the Chief Officer of  noticed smoke issuing from the ventilators of the № 2 hold of Fort Stikine. This was also seen a short time later by a DEMS gunner on board . Despite being seen by these (and other) witnesses, everyone assumed that the situation was under control. The alarm was not raised until 13:45. The fire pump in the ship's engine room was started and the firefighting operation began.

With crew members and stevedores abandoning ship, it was realised by the dock authorities that there was a problem on board Fort Stikine. A fire crew was sent on board and an order was given for more fire engines to be sent for. Due to difficulties in contacting the fire control centre, initially only two engines were sent. Those on board Fort Stikine were unable to discover the seat of the fire and water was poured blindly into the hold. With the arrival of the two fire appliances, there were now eleven hoses in use. Captain Oberst, of the Indian Army Ordnance Corps arrived a few minutes later to assess the situation. He was in charge of the explosives only after they had been landed. A meeting was held on board between the ship's officers, Oberst, and Commander Longmore of the Royal Indian Navy, the Chief Salvage Officer in Bombay. It was stated by Oberst that Fort Stikine had explosives equivalent to 150 Blockbuster bombs on board and that the ship should be scuttled. Her captain countered that the boiler room and engine room could be flooded, but he doubted that the ship would sink in that condition. More fire appliances arrived, bringing the total number of hoses in use to 32. By 14:45, ammunition in № 2 hold was exploding. Colonel Sadler, the general manager of the docks at Bombay, was sent for. He arrived at 14:50 and suggested that Fort Stikine should be removed from the docks, which would have required the use of tugs due to Fort Stikine being disabled. An argument developed and Colonel Sadler's parting remark was that the ship would probably explode before she could be taken out of port.

Shortly after 15:00, two fireboats, Doris and Panwell, arrived. A further nine hoses were played on the ship. Neither of the two people who could have taken overall charge of the situation were contactable, and none of those on board Fort Stikine were willing to take charge. Firefighting continued, but at 15:50 a flame erupted from the hold, reaching higher than the ship's mast. The order was given to abandon ship, with some jumping from the ship onto the quayside, and others into the water. At 16:06, an explosion occurred on board Fort Stikine. The ship was split in two, with her boiler found half a mile (800m) away. The explosion caused a tsunami within the dock, which deposited one vessel on the quayside. At 16:33, a second explosion occurred. The cargo ship  had her stern blown off. This explosion also wrecked the cargo liner .

Investigation
The accident was investigated by the authorities at Bombay. The report was released on 11 September 1944 and concluded that the fire and subsequent explosion on Fort Stikine was an accident. Sabotage was ruled out. The death toll was given as 231 service and port personnel killed, with 476 injured. Civilian casualties were in excess of 500 killed, with 2,408 treated in hospital.

Ships lost or severely damaged
Apart from Fort Stikine, the following vessels were sunk or severely damaged.

See also
, the ship destroyed in the Halifax Explosion during World War I
List of Allied convoys during World War II by region
Port Chicago disaster

References

Ships built in British Columbia
1942 ships
Ministry of War Transport ships
Maritime incidents in April 1944
History of Mumbai
1944 in India